The Kannada Sahitya Sammelana is the premier gathering of writers, poets and Kannadigas. It is held with the aim of preserving and developing the Kannada language, its literature, art, culture and music. It was started in 1915 by H. V. Nanjundaiah and held at Bangalore. It used to be inaugurated by prominent writers and poets from 1915 to 1948. Since then it has been inaugurated by the Chief Minister of Karnataka. The Kannada Sahitya Parishat is responsible for holding the gathering.

Recently held 

83rd Akhila Bharata Kannada Sahitya Sammelana held from 24 to 26 November in Mysore. Chandrashekar Patil popularly known as Champa was the president this year(2017).
84th Akhila Bharata Kannada Sammelana held at Dharwad during January 2019 Chandrashekara Kambara was the president. The 85th Akhila Bharatha Kannada Sahitya Sammelana was held in February 2020 at Kalburgi and H. S. Venkateshamurthy held the presidency of this event.

List of conferences

See also
 Kannada Sahitya Parishat

References

Kannada literature
Indian writers' organisations